This article lists the squads of all participating teams in the 2020–21 FIH Pro League. The nine national teams involved in the tournament were required to register a squad of up to 32 players.

Age, caps and club for each player are as of 17 January 2020, the first day of the season.

Argentina
The following is the Argentina squad for the 2020 FIH Pro League.

Head coach: Germán Orozco

Australia
The following is the Australia squad for the 2020 FIH Pro League.

Head coach: Colin Batch

Belgium
The following is the Belgium squad for the 2020 FIH Pro League.

Head coach:  Shane McLeod

Germany
The following is the Germany squad for the 2020 FIH Pro League.

Head coach: Kais al Saadi

Great Britain
The following is the Great Britain squad for the 2020 FIH Pro League.

Head coach:  Danny Kerry

India
The following is the India squad for the 2020 FIH Pro League.

Head coach:  Graham Reid

Netherlands
The following is the Netherlands squad for the 2020 FIH Pro League.

Head coach:  Maximiliano Caldas

New Zealand
The following is the New Zealand squad for the 2020 FIH Pro League.

Head coach: Darren Smith

Spain
The following is the Spain squad for the 2020 FIH Pro League.

Head coach:  Frederic Soyez

References

Squads
Men's FIH Pro League squads